MontieK is a Dutch watch brand that makes and sells tourbillon watches. The company was founded in 2011 by Jean Tarée.

The MontieK watches are assembled in Hong Kong, while the design and marketing team is located in Amsterdam, Netherlands.

MontieK watch movements are manufactured in China by the Tianjin Sea-Gull company.

References

External links 
 MontieK - Official website
 Successful Start for New Dutch Tourbillon Watch Brand MontieK - PRWeb

Watch brands
Dutch brands